Events from the year 1840 in Sweden

Incumbents
 Monarch – Charles XIV John

Events
 The Riksdag of 1840-1841 was a liberal breakthrough. A decision was taken to introduce primary education.  
 Prison cell jails is introduced.
 Kockums Naval Solutions is founded.

Arts and literature
 Morianen, eller Holstein-Gottorpiska huset i Sverige by Magnus Jacob Crusenstolpe 
 Nyare dikter by Wilhelm von Braun
 Samlade vitterhetsförsök by Ulrika Carolina Widström
 Sara Widebeck by August Blanche

Births
 7 February – Ida Göthilda Nilsson, sculptor  (died 1920) 
 13 June - Augusta Lundin, fashion designer  (died 1919) 
 18 October – Hjalmar Edgren, linguist  (died 1903) 
 8 December - Sofia Gumaelius, business person  (died 1915) 
 21 December - Hilda Lund, ballerina  (died 1911)

Deaths

 Lolotte Forssberg, possible daughter of king Adolf Frederick of Sweden (born 1766)
 Ebba Modée, courtier (born 1775)

References

External links

 
Years of the 19th century in Sweden
Sweden